The Queen Is in the Factory is a 2008 Turkish drama film, directed by Ali Kemal Güven, which follows the lives of homosexual young living together in the underbelly of Istanbul. The domestic distribution of the mobile was forbidden by Turkish authorities due to "moral incabbalities".

Plot
Yağmur (Dicle Kartal) is a young woman with very strict boundaries. She lives in Istanbul and works as a fashion editor. Yağmur doesn't accept the fact that her brother Bulut (Çağrı Aslan) is gay. Bulut, wishing to be a play writer someday created himself a world in his home where he can play Andy Warhol. And he named it Factory.

Life is a struggle for these two high-class children. While Yağmur is fighting against her boyfriend's (Fatih Günaydın) marriage expectations, Bulut is trying to fall in step with his boyfriend's life (Şenol Demir). While these two different relationships have their own battles trying to survive in some way, a death will change everything.

Cast

References

External links
 Kraliçe Fabrika'da, Digital Film Academy
 The Queen is in the Factory - Movie Trailer

2008 films
2008 drama films
2008 LGBT-related films
Films set in Turkey
Bisexuality-related films
Turkish drama films
2000s Turkish-language films
Turkish LGBT-related films
LGBT-related drama films